Skidaway Island State Park is a state park near Savannah, Georgia. The park borders Skidaway narrows, a part of Georgia’s intracoastal waterway. Trails wind through maritime forest and past salt marsh, leading to a boardwalk and observation tower. Visitors can watch for deer, fiddler crabs, raccoon, egrets and other wildlife. Inside the park’s interpretive center, birders will find binoculars, reference books and a window where they can look for migrating species such as Painted Buntings.
 
A scenic campground is nestled under live oaks and Spanish moss, and some RV sites have sewer hookups. Leashed pets are allowed.  Groups can enjoy privacy in their own pioneer campgrounds. Open-air picnic shelters and an enclosed group shelter are popular spots for parties, reunions and other celebrations.

The park’s new camper cabins offer screened porches, air conditioning, a bathroom with shower, kitchen, master bedroom and kids’ sleeping loft. Outside, visitors will find a picnic table, grill and fire ring.

Facilities
87 Tent/Trailer/RV Sites
5 Picnic Shelters
Group Shelter
3 Camper Cabins
3 Pioneer Campgrounds
Interpretive Center (Closed, Pending Construction)
2 Playgrounds
6 Miles of Hiking Trails

External links
Skidaway Island State Park
Coastal Georgia in Pictures

State parks of Georgia (U.S. state)
Protected areas of Chatham County, Georgia